Chicago Syndicate is a beat 'em up video game released by Sega of America in North America for the Game Gear in 1995. It is a spin-off of Eternal Champions centering on former cat burglar Larcen Tyler.

Plot
The game is set in the 1920s in an alternate reality from the Eternal Champions universe. In this universe, Larcen Tyler found out earlier that the package he was to send to the hospital by Tagilani was a bomb. He disposed of the bomb, resulting in it not killing the police chief of Chicago, people in the hospital, and Larcen himself. Because of this act, Tagliani considers Larcen a traitor and orders all the mobs in Chicago to kill him.

While in hiding, the police order Larcen to become a police informant and ask for Larcen to clean up the streets of Chicago in exchange for information about Tagliani's current whereabouts.

Reception

GamePro gave the game a mostly negative review, remarking that "the slow pace, small sprites, and awkward controls keep your quest dull and frustrating." He also criticized the enemies' lack of aggressiveness. Though he said the graphics are overall decent, he concluded the game to be only for hardcore Eternal Champions fans.

References

External links
 Chicago Syndicate at Mobygames

1995 video games
Sega beat 'em ups
Eternal Champions
Game Gear games
Game Gear-only games
North America-exclusive video games
Organized crime video games
Video games developed in the United States
Video games scored by Matthew Simmonds
Video games set in the 1920s
Video games set in Chicago
Video game spin-offs
Single-player video games
Sega video games